Chapin Memorial Church is a historic Universalist church at 12 Ford Avenue in Oneonta, Otsego County, New York. It was built in 1894 and is a one and a half-story brick building on a tall, cut stone foundation.  The facade consists of two parts: the main body of the church and the engaged three stage tower and entrance bay. It is characterized by an eclectic design that combines features characteristic of the Romanesque, Gothic Revival, and Queen Anne styles.

It was listed on the National Register of Historic Places in 2002.

References

External links
Unitarian Universalist Society of Oneonta, NY website

Unitarian Universalist churches in New York (state)
Churches on the National Register of Historic Places in New York (state)
Churches completed in 1894
19th-century churches in the United States
Churches in Otsego County, New York
Eclectic architecture
National Register of Historic Places in Otsego County, New York